Than Kyun or Davis Island is an island at the southern end of the Mergui Archipelago, Burma. It is the largest and highest island of the Alladin Islands, a scattered cluster of islands extending to the W and SSW of Zadetkyi Island. 
Off its eastern shore rises a  rock surrounded by a reef.

References 

Mergui Archipelago